The Coates' catfish (Neoarius coatesi) is a species of catfish in the family Ariidae. It was described by Patricia J. Kailola in 1990, originally under the genus Arius. It is endemic to Papua New Guinea, being only known from the Sepik and Ramu Rivers.

The diet of the Coates' catfish includes Macrobrachium prawns, aquatic insects and worms, detritus, bark, seeds and bony fish such as Ophieleotris aporos. It has been recorded spawning all year round.

References

Ariidae
Fish described in 1990